Vasile Gheorghe (born 9 May 1985) is a Romanian former footballer who played as a midfielder.

Honours
CSM Slatina
Liga III: 2019–20

References

External links
 
 

1985 births
Living people
Sportspeople from Brăila
Romanian footballers
Association football midfielders
Liga I players
Liga II players
Liga III players
FC Astra Giurgiu players
FC Universitatea Cluj players
CS Mioveni players
ASC Oțelul Galați players
FC Politehnica Iași (2010) players
CS Concordia Chiajna players
ASC Daco-Getica București players
FC Argeș Pitești players
CSM Slatina footballers
FC Dunărea Călărași players